Yury Pavlyukovets (born 24 June 1994) is a Belarusian professional footballer who plays for Neman Grodno.

Honours
Torpedo-BelAZ Zhodino
Belarusian Cup winner: 2015–16

External links 
 
 
 Profile at Dinamo Brest website

1994 births
Living people
Sportspeople from Pinsk
Belarusian footballers
Association football midfielders
FC Dynamo Brest players
FC Torpedo-BelAZ Zhodino players
FC Volna Pinsk players
FC UAS Zhitkovichi players
FC Belshina Bobruisk players
FC Neman Grodno players